Mullah Obaidullah the Akhund (– March 5, 2010) was the Defence Minister in the Afghan Taliban government of 1996–2001 and then an insurgent commander during the Taliban insurgency against the Afghan government of Hamid Karzai and the US-led NATO forces. He was captured by Pakistani security forces in 2007 and died of heart disease in a Pakistani prison in 2010.

Biography
Obaidullah Akhund was born in the Panjwai district of Kandahar Province in southern Afghanistan and was believed to be born in about 1968. He was of the Alakozai tribe.

Obaidullah Akhund became the Defense Minister of Afghanistan in April 1997, and the second of two top deputies to Mullah Omar, the spiritual leader of the Taliban movement. Obaidullah was seen as the "number three" man in the Taliban. In late 2001 or early 2002, Obaidullah surrendered to Afghan Northern Alliance troops near Kandahar and was then released as part of an amnesty.

He was one of the main Taliban military leaders in 2003 and was named to the Rahbari Shura. Abdul Latif Hakimi, who was captured by Pakistan in 2005, said that Obaidullah was one of two people with direct access to Mullah Omar and that Obaidullah had personally ordered insurgent attacks, including the killing of a foreign-aid official in March 2005.

Obaidullah was captured by Pakistani security forces in February 2007 in Quetta, Pakistan. He was the most senior Taliban official captured since the start of the war in Afghanistan in 2001. The arrest coincided with U.S. Vice President Dick Cheney's visit to Afghanistan and Pakistan in late February 2007, but the timing was reported to be a coincidence rather than a reaction to Cheney's visit.

Obaidullah was freed in November 2007 in exchange for the release of more than 200 Pakistani soldiers captured by the Taliban. He was rearrested in February 2008 and died on March 5, 2010, of heart disease inside a prison in Karachi, Pakistan.

References

2010 deaths
Taliban leaders
Afghan people imprisoned abroad
Prisoners who died in Pakistani detention
Pashtun people
Afghan expatriates in Pakistan
Year of birth uncertain
Taliban government ministers of Afghanistan
Defence ministers of Afghanistan